Oskar Michael Hans Karl Prinz von Preussen (born 6 May 1959) is a member of the House of Hohenzollern, the former ruling house of Prussia. He is the thirty-seventh Herrenmeister ("Master of the Knights" or Grand Master) of the Order of Saint John (Bailiwick of Brandenburg).

Life 
Oskar is the second son of Prince Wilhelm-Karl of Prussia and of his wife Armgard von Veltheim.  He is a great-grandson of Wilhelm II, the last German Emperor and King of Prussia.

In 1992 Oskar married Auguste Zimmermann von Siefart (born 1962).  They have three children:

 Oskar Julius Albo Carlos (born 1993)
 Wilhelmine (born 1995)
 Albert Burchard Carl Marcus Nikolaus (born 1998)

In 1995 Oskar was awarded a Ph.D. in history by the Free University of Berlin for his dissertation about the relationship between the Emperor Wilhelm II and the United States.  He has since made a career as a media manager: he has been managing director of the German branch of Discovery Channel, founder of KiKa, new media manager of Hubert Burda Media Group and radio manager of Holtzbrinck Publishing Group.

In 2017 Oskar was named Patron of the Altmark Festival, a music festival in Saxony-Anhalt.

Order of Saint John (Bailiwick of Brandenburg)
Since 1999 Oskar has been Herrenmeister (Grand Master) of the Order of Saint John (Bailiwick of Brandenburg).  Both his father Prince Wilhelm-Karl of Prussia and his grandfather Prince Oskar of Prussia had previously served as Herrenmeister.   

Oskar has been active in promoting the numerous charitable and volunteer organisations belonging to the Order.  In 2013 Oskar represented the Bailiwick at an ecumenical celebration in Berlin to observe the 900th anniversary of the Knights Hospitaller.  On June 25, 2021, he welcomed the President of Germany, Frank-Walter Steinmeier, to the Johanniter Hospital in Treuenbrietzen.

Works 
 Wilhelm II. und die Vereinigten Staaten von Amerika: zur Geschichte seiner ambivalenten Beziehung. Dissertation. Freie Universität Berlin 1995. Ars Una, Neuried 1997, .

Further reading
 Heinrich Freiherr von Massenbach: Die Hohenzollern einst und jetzt. 17. Auflage. Bonn 2004.
 Wolfgang Stribrny: Der Johanniter-Orden und das Haus Hohenzollern. Niederweisel 2004 (= Schriftenreihe des Hess. Genossenschaft des Johanniterordens, Heft 24).

References

External links 
 
 Internetseite des Hauses Hohenzollern
 Internetseite des „IBF Institut Berufsforschung Unternehmensplanung Medien e.V.“
 Videocast Interview mit Oskar Prinz von Preußen auf BibelTV

1959 births
German princes
Prussian princes
Living people
House of Hohenzollern
Discovery Channel people
Free University of Berlin alumni